The Lincoln Consolidated School District, known as Lincoln Consolidated Schools, is a school district based in Augusta Township, Michigan, in the United States. The Superintendent is Robert Jansen, who was hired in 2020. Lincoln High School is also one of the participating schools in the Early College Alliance @ EMU program.

Schools

The district manages seven schools:
 Lincoln High School
 Lincoln Middle School
 Bessie Hoffman School (closed in 2010 and currently vacant)
 Brick Elementary School
 Childs Elementary School
 Model Elementary School and Early Childhood Center
 Bishop Elementary School (Lincoln Multi Age and Spanish Immersion)

References

External links
 

School districts in Michigan
Ypsilanti, Michigan
Education in Washtenaw County, Michigan
Education in Wayne County, Michigan